Barreiros is a parish in Amares Municipality in the Braga District in Portugal. The population in 2011 was 760, in an area of 2.99 km².

References

Freguesias of Amares